Donald McNeill defeated Bobby Riggs 4–6, 6–8, 6–3, 6–3, 7–5 in the final to win the men's singles tennis title at the 1940 U.S. National Championships.

Seeds
The seeded players are listed below. Donald McNeill is the champion; others show the round in which they were eliminated.

  Bobby Riggs (finalist)
  Donald McNeill (champion)
  Francis Kovacs (quarterfinals)
  Frank Parker (quarterfinals)
  Joseph Hunt (semifinals)
  Henry Prusoff (fourth round)
  Bryan Grant (fourth round)
  Elwood Cooke (quarterfinals)
  Gardnar Mulloy (first round)
  Welby Van Horn (second round)

Draw

Key
 Q = Qualifier
 WC = Wild card
 LL = Lucky loser
 r = Retired

Final eight

Earlier rounds

Section 1

Section 2

Section 3

Section 4

Section 5

Section 6

Section 7

Section 8

References

External links
 1940 U.S. National Championships on ITFtennis.com, the source for this draw

Men's Singles
U.S. National Championships (tennis) by year – Men's singles